Donut Hole or Doughnut Hole or variation, may refer to:

 Doughnut hole, a ball-shaped doughnut originally made from the dough cut out to make the holes in donuts
 The Donut Hole, a bakery and landmark in California
 Doughnut hole (Medicare), a gap in U.S. Medicare coverage
 Donut Hole Agreement, a Bering Sea fisheries agreement

See also

 Donut (disambiguation)
 Hole (disambiguation)